TIme-dependent neutronics and temperatures (TINTE) is a two-group diffusion code for the study of nuclear and thermal behavior of high temperature reactors.  It was developed by Forschungszentrum Jülich in Germany, formally known as KFA, to investigate HTGRs in 2D (r-Z) geometry.

See also
 Neutron transport
 Nuclear technology

Nuclear technology
Nuclear power reactor types